Matt Alexander (born December 5, 1966) is a South African-born retired rugby union player who played at fly-half for the United States national rugby union team and the English rugby union club Sale Sharks.

Early life and career 
Alexander was born in South Africa on December 5, 1966. 
He began his professional playing career in rugby for the Sale Sharks, a professional rugby union club from Greater Manchester, England.

Alexander debuted for the United States national rugby union team on September 5, 1995.  
He made 24 official appearances for the USA Eagles and is third on their list of all-time leading scorers with 286 points.

See also

 United States national rugby union team

References

South African rugby union players
Rugby union fly-halves
Living people

1966 births
Sale Sharks players
United States international rugby union players